Mohd Azrul Ahmad (born 25 March 1985, in Penang, Malaysia) is a Malaysian professional football player who plays as a midfielder for Kelantan in the Malaysia Premier League.

Club career

Azrul made his debut with Penang in 2005. A transfer from Penang to Kedah was confirmed on 16 October 2008 when he and his teammate Mohd Farizal Rozali signed a two-year contract with the team.

During the 2009 season, he signed with Perlis and later signed with Felda United in 2011. After two seasons with Felda United, Azrul signed with ATM for 2014 season.

Penang FA 
Azrul went back to where he started, The Panthers Penang FA. Since then, he is plying his trade with The Panthers.

International career
Azrul earned his first international call-up while at Penang where he was a part of Malaysia squad for the 2008 Olympic Games qualification round. He played five out of six matches during the qualification with three of them as substitutions.

Honours
Kedah
Malaysian Charity Cup runners-up   : 2009 
Penang
Malaysia Premier League runners-up : 2015

References

External links

1985 births
Living people
Malaysian footballers
Malaysian people of Malay descent
Perlis FA players
People from Penang
Sportspeople from Penang
Association football midfielders